This timeline of Permian research is a chronological listing of events in the history of geology and paleontology focused on the study of earth during the span of time lasting from 298.9–252.17 million years ago and the legacies of this period in the rock and fossil records.

19th century

1828
 Brongn described the new genera Calamites and Glossopteris.

1854
 Meyer described the new genus Arthropleura.

1855 
 Geinitz described the new genus Halonia.
 Now it is considered synonymous with Arthropleura.1865

Gervais described the new genus Mesosaurus and species Mesosaurus tenuidens.

1870
Cope described the new genus Lystrosaurus.

1877
Cope described the new genus Diplocaulus.

1877
Cope described the new genus Dimetrodon.

1882
Cope described the new genus Edaphosaurus.

1887
Cope described the new genus Eryops.

 1889 

 Gürich described the new genus Ditrochosaurus and species Ditrochosaurus capensis.
 Gürich described the new species Mesosaurus capensis.
 Gürich synonymized subjectively Stereosternum with Mesosaurus.

1899
 Karpinsky described the new genus Helicoprion.

20th century

1904
 Broili described the new genus Seymouria.

1911
 Broom described the new genus and species Moschops capensis.

 1919 

 Pruvost synonymized subjectively Halonia with Arthropleura.

1922
 Amalitsky described the new genus Inostrancevia.

1937
 Stovall described the new genus Cotylorhynchus.

1948
 L. I. Price described the new genus  Prionosuchus.

 21st century 

 2018 

 Niko et al. described the new species Sutherlandia jamalensis.
 Wu et al. described the new species Juxathyris subcircularis. Torres-Martínez, Sour-Tovar and Barragán described the new genus Kukulkanus and species Kukulkanus spinosus.
 Afanasjeva, Jun-Ichi and Yukio described the new species Leurosina katasumiensis.
 Tazawa and Araki described the new species Neochonetes (Huangichonetes) matsukawensis.
 Terrill, Henderson and Anderson published article about histological sections of Ordovician and Permian conodont dental elements from the Bell Canyon Formation (Texas, United States), Harding Sandstone (Colorado, United States), Ali Bashi Formation (Iran) and Canadian Arctic, examining those fossils for the presence and distribution of soft tissue biomarkers.
 Yuan, Zhang and Shen described the new species Mesogondolella hendersoni.
 Golding and Orchard in Golding described the new genus Pustulognathus and species Pustulognathus vigilans.
 Read and Nestell described the new species Sweetognathus duplex.
 Read and Nestell described the new species Sweetognathus wardlawi.
 Golubev and Bulanov published article about description of anamniote tetrapod fossils from the Late Permian Sundyr Tetrapod Assemblage (Mari El, Russia).
 Tarailo published article about a study on the relationship between taxonomic and ecological diversity of temnospondyls across the Permian–Triassic boundary in the Karoo Basin of South Africa.
 Gee and Reisz published article about well-preserved postcranial skeletons of two dissorophids are described from the early Permian karst deposits near Richards Spur (Oklahoma, United States).
 Gee and Reisz published article about new skull remains of Cacops morrisi, as well as the first known postcranial remains of the taxon, are described from the Permian of the Richards Spur locality (Oklahoma, United States).

 2019 

 Abdala et al. described the new genus Vetusodon and new species Vetusodon elikhulu.
 Kammerer described the new genus Thliptosaurus and species Thliptosaurus imperforatus.
 Spindler, Werneburg and Schneider described the new genus Cabarzia and species Cabarzia trostheidei.
 Suchkova and Golubev described the new species Gorynychus sundyrensis.
 Suchkova and Golubev described the new genus Julognathus and species Julognathus crudelis.
 Reisz described the new genus Arisierpeton and species Arisierpeton simplex''.

See also

 History of paleontology
 Timeline of paleontology
 Timeline of Cambrian research
 Timeline of Ordovician research
 Timeline of Silurian research
 Timeline of Devonian research
 Timeline of Carboniferous research

References

Permian
Permian